BBC Northern Ireland (Ulster-Scots: BBC Norlin Airlan) is a division of the BBC and the main public broadcaster in Northern Ireland. It is widely available across both Northern Ireland and the Republic of Ireland.

BBC Northern Ireland is one of the four BBC national regions, together with the BBC English Regions, BBC Scotland and BBC Cymru Wales. Based at Broadcasting House, Belfast, it provides television, radio, online and interactive television content. BBC Northern Ireland currently employs 700 people, largely in Belfast.

BBC Northern Ireland has two TV channels - BBC One Northern Ireland, BBC Two Northern Ireland; and two radio stations - BBC Radio Ulster and BBC Radio Foyle.

Television 

BBC Northern Ireland operates two television stations: BBC One Northern Ireland and BBC Two Northern Ireland. BBC Northern Ireland funds an opt-out service with the majority of this output made in the independent sector. Some output that originates in London (so-called 'network' programmes) are time-shifted to create appropriate slots for programming that is more appealing to the BBC audience in NI.

Prior to 27 October 2006, BBC Two NI was a digital only service while BBC Two Northern Ireland was available on analogue transmission. Since 28 October 2006, BBC Two Northern Ireland has been the on-air name for both services which have been merged.

BBC Northern Ireland has its own team of continuity announcers which introduce the vast majority of programmes on BBC One and BBC Two in Northern Ireland.

Regional television 
 BBC Newsline is the regional news service. The main bulletin is from 18.30 to 19.00 with shorter bulletins at 13.30 and 22.30 and during the weekend, with summaries on BBC Breakfast. BBC NI produces some regional political programmes, notably Spotlight, The View and Nolan Live.

Network Output
As well as programmes intended purely for an audience in NI, BBC Northern Ireland also funds or often co-funds output for pan-UK consumption on both the player and other BBC channels. in 2021 network output is principally in drama.

It was announced in June 2019 that the BBC quiz show Mastermind would now be produced from BBC NI.

BBC Northern Ireland is also involved more occasionally in co-productions with other broadcasting networks, most notably with the Irish broadcaster RTÉ.

Republic of Ireland 
BBC One Northern Ireland and BBC Two Northern Ireland are widely available across the border in the Republic of Ireland. These channels are carried on pay-TV platforms in the Republic including Sky Ireland, Virgin Media Ireland, Magnet Networks, SCTV and Crossan Cable. BBC One NI and BBC Two NI are also available in the Republic via signal overspill by Freeview in counties near the Northern Ireland border. Similarly, prior to the digital switchover in 2012, they were available in these areas via analogue television.
Additional BBC channels such as BBC Three, BBC Four, BBC News, BBC World News and children's television channels CBBC and CBeebies, are also available within the Republic of Ireland via a free-to-air satellite receiver or, in some areas near the border, via overspill from the Freeview service. Leading subscription TV providers also carry these channels.

Radio 
BBC Northern Ireland operates two radio stations:
 BBC Radio Ulster, on 92–95 FM, (and previously on 1341 kHz Medium Wave, that is now discontinued), which broadcasts throughout Northern Ireland, and
 BBC Radio Foyle, on 93.1 FM and (and previously on 792 Medium Wave), which broadcasts to the North West of Northern Ireland

BBC Northern Ireland takes part in the 'Regionalisation' of some of the BBC's national radio output. From the late 1990s until 2012, for example, Radio 1 split the home nations on Thursday morning from midnight to 2 a.m., with Scotland, Wales and Northern Ireland broadcasting their own shows to showcase regional talent. The Radio 1 session from Northern Ireland was last presented by Phil Taggart from Omagh.

Online 
BBC Northern Ireland's online service provides News, Sport, Schools, Learning and Programme information for television and radio programmes.  It provides a streaming audio service for Radio Ulster and Radio Foyle as well as every programme on demand for up to a week after transmission. bbc.co.uk/northernireland/ is part of BBC Online and operated from the Belfast base. It also provides multi platform interactivity for TV programmes including the annual Schools' Cup Rugby union and Gaelic Athletic Association finals.

Programmes

Radio 
 Good Morning Ulster
 The Nolan Show
 Gardeners’ Corner
 Talkback
 Evening Extra
 Sunday Sequence

Television 
 BBC Newsline
 Spotlight
 The View
 The Blame Game
 Beauty Queen & Single
 The Paddy Raff Show
 Give My Head Peace

Television news bulletins 
 Ulster Mirror (1950s)
 Scene Around Six (1969 – September 1984)
 Inside Ulster (September 1984 – 12 February 1996)
 Newsline 6.30/Newsline/BBC Newsline (12 February 1996 to date)

Selection of network programmes 
 Ballykissangel (late 1990s)
 Sesame Tree (Children's Series, late 2000s)
 Murphy's Law
 Patrick Kielty Almost Live

Sports

BBC NI has, at various times, over the last decades of the 20th century and the early decades of the 21st, provided live and pre-recorded coverage of all three major male sports in NI - Irish League soccer, Ulster Rugby and GAA.  In the increasingly expensive world of sports rights and contracts the regional output has never covered all three concurrently but covers the sports extensively in radio news bulletins.

Languages 
BBC Northern Ireland broadcasts almost exclusively in English, but there is some output  in Irish and Ulster Scots.
Radio Ulster carries a daily programme in Irish and there is an Irish language section on BBC Northern Ireland's website. Northern Ireland Screen helps co-fund television output in both Irish and Ulster Scots.

Technical 

The BBC television and radio stations are broadcast primarily from the Divis (500 kW), Limavady and Brougher Mountain transmitters. Both transmitters receive the BBC stations via a satellite feeds and each transmitter has a wealth of relay transmitters to provide analogue service to areas not served by their respective main transmitter.

TV Studios 

BBC Northern Ireland has three main television studios located in Belfast. There are two small studios located in the BBC Broadcasting House in Belfast. These are home to BBC Northern Ireland's regional news and current affairs programmes. They are around  each and are called Studio B and Studio 1.

The largest of the studios is called Studio A which is located in the BBC Blackstaff House on Great Victoria Street in Belfast. The studio measures . Studio A has been home to the award-winning local sitcom Give My Head Peace. Nolan Live for BBC One NI airs live from Studio A.

BBC NI broadcasters

Current BBC NI broadcasters 
Sarah Brett - Good Morning Ulster
Chris Buckler - Good Morning Ulster
 Stephen Nolan - presenter of The Nolan Show on BBC Radio Ulster, Nolan Live on BBC One NI and a weekend phone-in programme on BBC Radio Five Live 
 Tara Mills - presenter of BBC Newsline and Evening Extra
 Declan Harvey - presenter of BBC Newsline and Evening Extra
 Mark Carruthers - presenter Sunday Politics NI and The View
 Richard Morgan - presenter Evening Extra
 Connor Philips
 Lynette Faye
 Hugo Duncan – presenter of Country Afternoon on BBC Radio Ulster

Former BBC NI broadcasters 
 Gerry Anderson –  presented The Gerry Anderson Show on BBC Radio Ulster/Foyle and famed for broadcasting without a script.
 Gloria Hunniford – BBC NI presenter who had her own daily show on Radio Ulster before a move to BBC Radio 2 
 Patrick Kielty – comedian
 Colin Murray – Talksport presenter and former BBC Radio 1 DJ started with BBC Radio Ulster as a presenter on the Across the Line programme
 Sean Rafferty – former presenter of Scene Around Six and Inside Ulster, evening news programmes broadcast until the mid-1990s, as well as BBC Radio Ulster news programmes, now a BBC Radio 3 music presenter
 Noel Thompson
 Donna Traynor

References

External links 

 
Northern Ireland
Television networks in Ireland
Mass media companies of Northern Ireland
Mass media in Belfast
Radio stations in Northern Ireland
Television in Northern Ireland